Northcliffe light rail station is located on the southern end of Surfers Paradise Blvd on the corner of Thorton St in the suburb of Surfers Paradise, Queensland, Australia, Gold Coast's key tourist destination. The station is serviced by the Gold Coast G:link light rail system that connects Broadbeach South with Helensvale via Surfers Paradise and Southport.

Location 
Below is a map of the area surrounding the station.{
  "type": "FeatureCollection",
  "features": [
    {
      "type": "Feature",
      "properties": {},
      "geometry": {
        "type": "Point",
        "coordinates": [
          153.42939376831058,
          -28.01024058198237
        ]
      }
    }
  ]
}

See also
 G:link

References

G:link stations
Railway stations in Australia opened in 2014
Surfers Paradise, Queensland